Javorn Stevens (born 9 May 1998) is an Antiguan footballer who plays as a forward for Greenbay Hoppers.

International career

International goals
Scores and results list Antigua and Barbuda's goal tally first.

References

External links 
 

1998 births
Living people
Antigua and Barbuda footballers
Antigua and Barbuda international footballers
Tacoma Defiance players
USL Championship players
Association football forwards
Antigua and Barbuda youth international footballers
Antigua and Barbuda under-20 international footballers